Mohammad Reza Rajabi (born 10 January 1986) is an Iranian handball player for Naft Al-Janoob and the Iranian national team.

References

1986 births
Living people
Iranian male handball players
Asian Games silver medalists for Iran
Asian Games bronze medalists for Iran
Asian Games medalists in handball
Handball players at the 2006 Asian Games
Handball players at the 2010 Asian Games
Handball players at the 2014 Asian Games
Medalists at the 2006 Asian Games
Medalists at the 2010 Asian Games
21st-century Iranian people